Mohammad Ahmad Abdullah Al-Harithi (1962 – 27 May 2018) an Omani poet and writer. He was born in Al Mudharib. He obtained a bachelor's degree in geology and marine sciences from Qatar University in 1986. He worked in the Center for Marine and Fisheries Sciences, traveling between Morocco and Oman. He first published his poetry in some Arab periodicals, such as Al-Karmel and Mawaqif. He has several collections of poetry and is considered a pioneer in travel literature in Oman.

His biography 
Mohammad Ahmad Abdullah Al-Harithi was born in 1962 AD / 1381 AH in Al Mudhairib. He received a Bachelor's degree in Geology and Marine Sciences from Qatar University in 1986. He worked at the Center for Marine and Fisheries sciences from 1987 to 1990, and he moved between Morocco and Oman. In addition to poetry, he was interested in writing literary articles, wrote vertical poetry and prose poems, and published his literature first in Arab periodicals such as Al-Karmel and Mawaqif. Al-Harthy died at dawn on 27 May, 2018/13 Ramadan 1439, after a struggle with illness, at the age of fifty-six years in Muscat.

His awards 

 2003: Ibn Battuta Prize for Travel Literature in its first session.
 2014: Outstanding Cultural Achievement Award in the Sultanate of Oman.

His writings 

 Among his poems
 "uyoon tiwal al nahar" (Eyes All Day), 1992
 "kol Layla wa dohaha" (each Overnight), 1994
 "abead min zanjabar" (Beyond Zanzibar), 1997
 "foussaifissae hawae" (Eve mosaic)
 "loeba la tumall" (amayzing game)
 "Awda li al kitaba bi qalem al rassas" (Back to writing with a pencil)

Among his book 

 "tanqih al makhtuta", (Manuscript revision), novel 2013
 "warshat al madi", (• Past Workshop, Collection of Articles), 2013
 "hayati qasida wadadtu law 'aktubuha" (My life is a poem that I wanted to write)
 "qarib a lkalimat yarsu", (The boat of words is moored), selections from some of his poems
 "al athar al shieria li'abi muslim al bahlani", (The Poetic Effects of Abu Muslim Al-Bahlani),
 "muhit katfindu, rihla fi al Himalaya" (Kaftandu Ocean, Himalayan Tours)

References 

1962 births
2018 deaths
Omani poets
Omani writers
Qatar University alumni
Travel writers